Bogale (also spelled Bogalay) is a small city located in the Bogale Township, Ayeyarwady Region, Myanmar (Burma). It is located on the south-western part of Myanmar on the mainland section of the country. It can be reached by both water transportation and by land.

History of the region
The history of the Bogale must begin with its first known inhabitants. The Mons are believed to have first inhabited the region in 3000 BC. Although most of the Mons records and writings have been destroyed through war or simply over time, spoken Burmese tradition states that the Mons began instituting Buddhist beliefs into their culture around 300 BC. By the 9th century the Mons are believed to have most of southern present-day Myanmar. The Mons had a hybrid culture that combined Indian and Mon culture.

After briefly losing power in the region to the Bagan Kingdom, the Mons regained control of the southern region of Myanmar in 1472 under King Dhammazedi. During King Dhammazedi 20-year reign from 1472 to 1492 the area currently encompassed by the Bogalay Township experienced a time of rapid economic growth and increase in cultural identity, with roots in Theravada Buddhism. The region became a key post in commerce of Southeast Asia. By 1757 the Mons had been stripped of their power in southern Myanmar and the Konbaung dynasty had begun. The leader responsible for taking control of southern Myanmar and unifying the north and the south was Alaungpaya. Under the Konbaung dynasty the capital of Myanmar was established at Rangoon. The Konbaung dynasty was a time of constant warfare, typically of aggression.

By the turn of the 19th century, Britain had gained complete control over all of Burma via the three Anglo-Burmese Wars. Britain's occupation of Burma drastically changed the culture of southern Burma (Bogalay Township Region). An infiltration of Christianity began to take place in southern Burmese regions. In the early 1900s, Burmese citizens of the south began protesting for their freedom from Britain. By 1923, peaceful protests against the British resulted in elections of a Burmese legislator with limited power. Student movements, aimed at expediting the process of freeing Burmese from British/Indian rule, were organized and help facilitate the peasant rebellion in 1930. In 1937 Britain finally agreed to separate Burma from India and allowed Burma to elect a full legislative branch with complete power.

In 1962, the current military regime that rules Myanmar today took control of the government. The military government got rid of the democratic elections and served as a dictatorship over its citizens. In 1992 the military Junta decided it would return democratic elections to the populace. Aung San Suu Kyi won the 1992 national election by a landslide victory. However, the military Junta refused to give up its power and put Aung San Suu Kyi under house arrest for a few years.

On May 2, 2008, Cyclone Nargis reached the southern part of Myanmar. The cyclone resulted in the death of hundreds of thousands of Burmese citizens and even more families being displaced from their homes. The current military Junta's response or lack of response to the crisis has made light of the brutality of the regime abroad.

Culture

Naming system
The Bogale Township has a very rich and diverse culture due to its high numbers of ethnic groups. Traditionally, the "naming system" in this region, as well as Myanmar as a whole, is vastly different from the naming system that exists in western countries. The concept of a "family name" does not exist in the Burmese culture. A person is usually addressed according to his age. For older people, their names are pre-fixed with U (pronounced Oo) and Daw and are the equivalents of Mr. and Ms. respectively. A young adult is addressed by the Honorifics Ko (for males) and Ma (for females). A child is referred to as Maung and Ma for males and females respectively. Children's names are often decided by the day of birth. Each day of the week has a list of traditional names that are attached to it. Furthering the differences between the naming system in the Bogalay Township and the western world is the fact that women keep their names after marriage in Burma. This absence of a family name in the region makes tracing one's heritage back very difficult, if not impossible.

Religions
The primary religion of this region, as well as Burma as a whole, is Buddhism. More specifically, Theravada Buddhism is widespread throughout the region. Burmese of the Bogalay Township believe in reincarnation. This meaning that if an individual commits too many sins throughout his or her lifetime they will be reincarnated into a lower life form. Burmese Buddhists’ ultimate goal is to live a near sin-less life so that a person can reach the highest form of reincarnation, which is Nirvana. Christians and Muslims exist as small minorities within the Bogalay Township. For the most part, these Christians and Muslims exist within the small ethnic minority villages.

Ceremonies
The people of the Bogale Township celebrate some of the same ceremonies that are celebrated in the western world. A man and a woman's marriage ceremony and marriage process is surprisingly quite comparable to the traditions in the US. Friends of the bride and groom will traditionally present gifts to both people prior to the wedding ceremony. Like in the United States, in order to get married a couple can have a large celebration or can go to the local government building and sign the paperwork over. When a loved one is sick and near death it is typical of Burmese to bring gifts such as fruits or canned cereals to the ill person. Unfortunately, the hospitals in the Bogalay Township are not trusted by many; thus, ill persons often die from simple illnesses that could be treated with basic antibiotics. When a loved one passes away the family has the choice of burial or cremation. A funeral typically will be held within 3–5 days of the passing away.

Another ceremony that is celebrated widely among the Bogale Township populace is the Water Festival (Thingyan). The people go to the streets to do traditional dances and arts for three days in order to usher in the New Year in the Myanmar calendar. The town's youth traditionally will throw water on people from numerous stages that have been set up on the streets to signify the cleansing of one's sins or wrongdoings away.

Economy
The Bogale Township region of Myanmar/Burma has many natural resources that drive their economy. The products that are made from the natural resources are taxed harshly by the oppressive military Junta. The people of the Bogalay Township see little to no benefit of the taxation the government places on their products and commerce. Outside of the main city limits, roads are sketchy at best and people are practically cut off from the main Bogale city.

Agriculture
Because of the Bogale Township's ideal location on the base of the delta, farming and agriculture are huge industries in the region. The Bogale Township region is one of the largest producers of rice in all of Myanmar. The rice is grown during two crop seasons. The first season, which typically yields less rice than the second season, occurs between June and September–December during the rainy season. The second growing season is actually shorter but yields a greater amount of rice. This season goes from March–June.

The rice is typically processed in factories in downtown Bogalay. The largest of these factories employs 2,500 workers in downtown Bogale. This rice is often sold in local markets as a vital source of food for villagers. The national government, military Junta, heavily tax the rice production and profits in the region. This is a key source of revenue for the military governmental regime.

Fishing
In addition to the region's geographically friendly atmosphere towards agriculture, the Bogale Township is also ideal for fishing in certain times of the year. Fish can be caught in large amounts and sold in the markets as a supplement to the frequent purchases of rice. The government also harshly taxes the fishing industry.
Forestry

Another key Industry in the Bogale Township region is forestry. Lumber is cut down in the region and processed in factories. The lumber is typically exported to foreign countries within Southeast Asia or sent to the northern, less wooded areas of Myanmar. Environmentalists abroad have been critical of the rate in which trees have been cut down in the region.

Political situation
The current political situation within the Bogale Township is typical of the rest of Myanmar/Burma. The people within the Bogale Township suffer from the oppression of the military Junta. The military Junta came to power in Myanmar in 1962. The Junta held "free democratic elections" in 1992 for the first time in three decades. Aung San Suu Kyi won the election by a landslide, yet the military refused to give up power. Than Shwe has headed the cruel military Junta in Myanmar since 1992.

During military rule, the people of the Bogale Township lived in constant fear of speaking out against the Junta. The citizens feared being thrown in jail without any sort of legitimate due process. It was not uncommon for a journalist, blogger, or just outspoken man or woman to be thrown in jail for as long as thirty years for speaking out against the regime.

However, for the most part, the people living in the more urban, developed areas of the Bogale Township were not oppressed nearly as much as their counterparts in the small villages on the outskirts of the Bogale Township. In these small villages where large amounts of ethnic minorities lived, there was widespread, cruel ethnic cleansing being conducted by the military Junta. In the years/months preceding the NLD government, the atrocities that the Junta performed in this Bogale Township region have been a hot topic among international organizations and human rights activists.

Nargis cyclone
Cyclone Nargis was the deadliest natural disaster ever recorded to hit Burma. The Bogale Township region in southern Myanmar was one of the worst affected areas of the cyclone that hit the area May 2, 2008. In downtown Bogale, 90% of the homes are believed to have been destroyed by the tropical storm. Government officials estimate that over 10,000 people were left dead in the Bogalay Township region alone after the initial storm. Without proper aid relief and reconstruction of the region, this number could continue to rise dramatically.

In addition to the hardships the people of the Bogale Township are facing amidst the cyclone, their very own government has done a poor job of bringing aid to the region. As soon as news of the devastation in southern Burma hit foreign countries, aid was offered from countless countries and NGOs alike. Some countries that offered aid were the United States, Canada, Great Britain, France, and Thailand. However, the military Junta in Burma initially refused to allow foreign aid in. The Junta said they would accept the aid and money but refused any foreign manpower. This was met with widespread anger and displeasure within the country as well as abroad. Currently the case of Burma is being brought up to the United Nations. The UN is exploring potential human rights violations within the Burmese regions hardly hit by the Nargis Cyclone, such as the Bogale Township.

Notable people
 

Mya Thaung (born 1943), Burmese painter

References

Populated places in Ayeyarwady Region
Township capitals of Myanmar